The WEY VV6 is a compact luxury crossover of Great Wall Motor’ brand, WEY.

Overview

The VV6 shares the same platform as the WEY VV5 and the second generation Haval H6. Prices of the VV6 ranges from 148,000 to 175,000 yuan.

The WEY VV6 is powered by the 2.0 liter inline-4 turbo engine producing 227hp from the VV5, with the engine mated to a 7-speed dual-clutch transmission also shared with the VV5.

References

VV6
compact sport utility vehicles
Front-wheel-drive vehicles
All-wheel-drive vehicles
Cars introduced in 2018
Cars of China